On 6 May 2022, an explosion occurred in a building in Madrid, Spain, killing 2 people and wounding 18 others. Spanish emergency services commented they were looking for two missing workers doing work on the building and found the bodies of two people after an hour-long examination.

See also
 2021 Madrid explosion

References

2022 disasters in Spain
Explosion
Explosions in 2022
2022
May 2022 events in Spain